K. V. Sasikanth (born 17 July 1995) is an Indian cricketer who plays for Andhra Pradesh. He made his first-class debut on 22 October 2015 in the 2015–16 Ranji Trophy. He made his List A debut on 10 December 2015 in the 2015–16 Vijay Hazare Trophy.

He was the joint-leading wicket-taker for Andhra in the 2018–19 Ranji Trophy, with 17 dismissals in four matches.

References

External links
 

1995 births
Living people
Indian cricketers
Andhra cricketers
Cricketers from Visakhapatnam